Nemotrichus is a genus of beetles belonging to the family Anthribidae.

The species of this genus are found in Southern America.

Species:
 Nemotrichus andicola Jordan, 1904 
 Nemotrichus angulatus Jordan, 1906

References

Anthribidae